The Shavrov Sh-7 was a Soviet civil transport amphibious aircraft designed by Vadim Shavrov. Although it was ordered into production for Aeroflot, the start of the Great Patriotic War resulted in only a single prototype being built.

Design and development
The Sh-7 was an amphibious flying boat with a cantilever monoplane wing mounted high on the fuselage. It had a crew of two and a cabin for four passengers. Its single MG-31F engine was strut-mounted above the wing, driving a two-bladed  propeller. The prototype first flew on 16 June 1940 and by the end of the year it was decided to put the type into production. The start of the Great Patriotic War in June 1941 halted production and the prototype was then used to carry freight and passengers between Saratov and Astrakhan for a few months.

Specifications

See also

References

Notes

Bibliography

 
 

1940s Soviet civil utility aircraft
Flying boats
Sh-7
High-wing aircraft
Amphibious aircraft
Single-engined tractor aircraft
Aircraft first flown in 1940
Engine-over-wing aircraft